Stanny Van Paesschen (born 24 April 1957) is a Belgian equestrian and Olympic medalist. He was born in Antwerp. He competed in show jumping at the 1976 Summer Olympics in Montreal, and won a bronze medal with the Belgian team.

References

1957 births
Living people
Belgian male equestrians
Olympic equestrians of Belgium
Olympic bronze medalists for Belgium
Equestrians at the 1976 Summer Olympics
Equestrians at the 1996 Summer Olympics
Equestrians at the 2004 Summer Olympics
Olympic medalists in equestrian
Medalists at the 1976 Summer Olympics
Sportspeople from Antwerp